Unnikrishnan is a Hindu name commonly used in the Indian state of Kerala. Unnikrishnan refers to the infant form of the Hindu deity Krishna. The following is list of people named Unnikrishnan:

Given name
Unnikrishnan Manukrishnan (born 1988), Indian cricketer
Unnikrishnan Namboothiri, Indian Malayalam actor
Unnikrishnan Puthur (1933–2014), Malayalam–language novelist and short story writer
Unnikrishnan Thiruvazhiyode (born 1942), Indian civil servant and Malayalam language novelist

Surname
B. Unnikrishnan (born Unnikrishnan Bhaskaran Pillai in 1970), Indian film director and screenwriter
K.P. Unnikrishnan, Indian politician
Oduvil Unnikrishnan (1944–2006), Indian film actor
 P. Unnikrishnan (born 1966), Indian Carnatic vocalist and playback singer
Roopa Unnikrishnan, Indian-born American sports shooter
Sandeep Unnikrishnan (1977–2008), Indian military officer
Vallathol Unnikrishnan Indian Malayalam actor
Vishnu Unnikrishnan, Malayalam actor and script writer
Uthara Unnikrishnan (born 2004), Indian playback singer

Indian given names
Indian surnames